Kagunga is an administrative ward in Kigoma District of Kigoma Region in Tanzania. 
In 2016 the Tanzania National Bureau of Statistics report there were 18,681 people in the ward, from 16,972 in 2012.

Villages / neighborhoods 
The ward has 2 villages and 11 hamlets.

 Zashe
 Mibombo
 Misemele
 Mkwale
 Mwibona
 Ngonya
 Kagunga
 Kagunga Na. 1
 Makombe
 Mkwale
 Mramakahono
 Nyamirambo
 Rusolo

References

Wards of Kigoma Region